Scout Alexis Benson Torres (born 22 February 1994) is an American-born Puerto Rican footballer who plays as a forward. She has been a member of the Puerto Rico women's national team.

Early life
Benson was raised in Lynnfield, Massachusetts.

International goals
Scores and results list Puerto Rico's goal tally first.

References

1994 births
Living people
Women's association football forwards
Puerto Rican women's footballers
Puerto Rico women's international footballers
American women's soccer players
Soccer players from Massachusetts
People from Lynnfield, Massachusetts
American sportspeople of Puerto Rican descent
Bryant Bulldogs women's soccer players
Sportspeople from Essex County, Massachusetts